Passage Peak is a prominent  mountain summit located in the Chugach Mountains, in the U.S. state of Alaska. Although modest in elevation, relief is significant since the southern aspect of the mountain rises up from the tidewater of Prince William Sound's Passage Canal in approximately five miles. The peak takes its name from Passage Canal, which in turn was named in 1794 by Captain George Vancouver, presumably because it leads to a portage connecting Prince William Sound with Cook Inlet.

Climate

Based on the Köppen climate classification, Passage Peak is located in a subarctic climate zone with long, cold, snowy winters, and mild summers. Weather systems coming off the Gulf of Alaska are forced upwards by the Chugach Mountains (orographic lift), causing heavy precipitation in the form of rainfall and snowfall. Temperatures can drop below −20 °C with wind chill factors below −30 °C. This climate supports the Billings Glacier on the south aspect, and immense Harriman Glacier on the north slope.

See also

List of mountain peaks of Alaska
Geography of Alaska

References

External links
National Weather Service Forecast

Mountains of Alaska
Kenai Mountains-Turnagain Arm National Heritage Area
North American 1000 m summits